Lidia Parada Santos (born 11 June 1993) is a Spanish athlete specialising in the javelin throw. She represented her country at two European Championships without qualifying for the final.

Her personal best in the event is 61.25 metres set in Getafe in 2018.

International competitions

References

1993 births
Living people
Spanish female javelin throwers
Sportspeople from the Province of A Coruña
People from A Coruña (comarca)
European Games competitors for Spain
Athletes (track and field) at the 2019 European Games